Ethadophis is a genus of eels in the snake eel family Ophichthidae. It currently contains the following species:

 Ethadophis akkistikos McCosker & J. E. Böhlke, 1984 (Indifferent eel)
 Ethadophis byrnei Rosenblatt & McCosker, 1970 (Ordinary eel)
 Ethadophis epinepheli (Blache & Bauchot, 1972)
 Ethadophis foresti (Cadenat & C. Roux, 1964)
 Ethadophis merenda Rosenblatt & McCosker, 1970 (Snack eel)

References

 

Ophichthidae